Tahir Ahmad Naseem, an American citizen from Illinois, was killed on July 29, 2020 in a courtroom in Peshawar. According to the United States Department of State, Naseem had been lured to Pakistan from his home in Illinois by individuals who then used Pakistan's blasphemy laws to entrap him. The U.S. Government has been providing consular assistance to Naseem and his family since his detention in 2018 and has called the attention of senior Pakistani officials to his case to prevent the type of act that eventually occurred. Naseem was shot 6 times by Faisal Khan, a 21-year old local resident. Naseem was a former member of the Ahmadi sect. According to the official spokesman for the Ahmadi community in Pakistan, Naseem had previously renounced his affiliation with the Ahmadi community and embraced Sunni Islam. His death spurred thousands in support of his killer to rally in Peshawar.

References 

July 2020 events in Pakistan
Deaths in police custody in Pakistan
Murder in Peshawar
Blasphemy law in Pakistan